Michael Schemer (November 20, 1917 – April 22, 1983), nicknamed "Lefty", was an American professional baseball player whose eight-year (1940–1942; 1944–1948) career included 32 games played in Major League Baseball for the – New York Giants.

Early life
A native of Baltimore, Maryland, he was Jewish and the son of an Orthodox rabbi. He attended Miami High School and the University of Miami.

Schemer served in the United States Army during the World War II era.

Baseball career
Prior to his professional career, Mike played as an amateur on the United States team assembled by international baseball proponent Leslie Mann in the inaugural Amateur World Series held in England in 1938.

All but one of his Major League appearances occurred during the 1945 season. Called up from the Jersey City Giants of the International League, Schemer made his MLB debut for the New York Giants on August 8, 1945, against the St. Louis Cardinals at the Polo Grounds. He notched two singles in four at bats against Cardinals' left-hander George Dockins. He hit well for the Giants in his rookie season. In 31 games he had a batting average of .333 (36-for-108) with one home run, 10 runs batted in, 10 runs scored, and a slugging percentage of .407. Defensively, he made two errors in 27 appearances at first base and had a fielding percentage of .993. He hit his only MLB home run on August 20, a three-run blast against Hank Wyse, the 20-game-winner from the Chicago Cubs.

However, with the return of Giants' slugger Johnny Mize from military service in 1946, Schemer would get into only one more game for New York. On April 24, 1946 he went 0-for-1 as a pinch-hitter, bringing his lifetime average down to .330.

Personal life
Schemer married Illinois native Gloria Lowe and divorced in the mid 60’s. They had three children: Nancy, Michael, and Sophie Schemer.

Schemer died at the age of 65 in Miami, Florida.

References

External links

Retrosheet

1917 births
1983 deaths
Baseball players from Baltimore
Fort Smith Giants players
Jacksonville Tars players
Jersey City Giants players
Jewish American baseball players
Jewish Major League Baseball players
Major League Baseball first basemen
Miami Beach Flamingos players
New York Giants (NL) players
Richmond Colts players
Sacramento Solons players
Salisbury Giants players
United States Army soldiers
University of Miami alumni
West Palm Beach Indians players
Miami Senior High School alumni
United States Army personnel of World War II
20th-century American Jews